Frasne is a commune in the Doubs department in the Bourgogne-Franche-Comté region in eastern France.

The local railway station, Gare de Frasne, was opened on 10 June 1855.

Population

See also
 Communes of the Doubs department

References

External links

 Website of the village www.frasne.net 

Communes of Doubs